His Only Son is a 1912 American short silent Western film co-starring Wallace Reid and Dorothy Davenport. It was directed by Jack Conway and Milton H. Fahrney.

Cast
 Wallace Reid 
 Dorothy Davenport
 Jack Conway
 Victoria Forde
 Hoot Gibson

See also
 Hoot Gibson filmography
 Wallace Reid filmography

References

External links
 

1912 films
1912 Western (genre) films
1912 short films
American silent short films
American black-and-white films
Films directed by Jack Conway
Silent American Western (genre) films
1910s American films